Justin Conn (born August 29, 1988) is a professional Canadian football linebacker who is currently playing with the BC Lions. He was drafted 47th overall by the Montreal Alouettes in the 2010 CFL Draft. He played college football for the Bishop's Gaiters.

External links

References

1988 births
Living people
Bishop's Gaiters football players
Calgary Stampeders players
Canadian football linebackers
Montreal Alouettes players
Players of Canadian football from New Brunswick
Sportspeople from Fredericton